Dr. R.P. Hendry (or "Locomotive 23") was the only locomotive operated by the Manx Electric Railway (MER) on the Isle of Man. It has since been joined by loco no 34, Maria. https://manxelectricrailway.co.uk/loco-no-34-1995/

Constructed by the railway company in 1900, and later rebuilt with wagon bodies on either side, the locomotive is now privately owned.  It was restored in 1983 and operated as part of the centenary and subsequent celebrations, painted in the "Isle of Man Tramways & Electric Power Co. Ltd." livery.  In 1993 the vehicle was named  "Dr R. Preston Hendry" in recognition of the man who did so much to save the railways of the island at a difficult time.

The locomotive is currently stored off-site by its owner, but it is hoped to return it to home metals on the MER in the future, for possible use on demonstration and/or permanent way duties.

References

Also
Manx Electric Railway Rolling Stock

Sources
 Manx Manx Electric Railway Fleetlist (2002) Manx Electric Railway Society
 Island Island Images: Manx Electric Railway Pages (2003) Jon Wornham
 Official Official Tourist Department Page (2009) Isle Of Man Heritage Railways

Manx Electric Railway